The LP12 Mall of Berlin, or simply Mall of Berlin, is a shopping mall in Berlin, Germany.

See also
 List of shopping malls in Germany

External links

Shopping malls in Berlin
Mitte